The seventh season of the American animated television series The Fairly OddParents premiered on . On July 10 of that year, a special called "Anti-Poof" also aired, introducing new series villain, Foop. The season later ended on August 5, 2012. The season was produced by Billionfold Inc., Frederator Studios, and Nickelodeon Animation Studio.

Episodes

DVD releases

References

2009 American television seasons
2010 American television seasons
2011 American television seasons
2012 American television seasons
The Fairly OddParents seasons